Trusadh is a Scottish Gaelic television news magazine programme that has been running since 2008 and that is shown on BBC Alba television. The contents of the programme range from sex reassignment surgery, to wolfdog ownership in the Highlands of Scotland.

References

External links
 
Mac.TV (producers of Trusadh)

BBC Alba shows
2009 Scottish television series debuts
BBC Regional News shows
Scottish television news shows
2009 establishments in Scotland
2000s Scottish television series
2010s Scottish television series